Polly Ward (born Byno Poluski; 30 June 1912–23 February 1987) was a British singer and actress.

Filmography
 The Marriage Business (1927)
 Alf's Button (1930)
 Harmony Heaven (1930)
 His Lordship (1932)
 Kentucky Minstrels (1934)
 The Old Curiosity Shop (1934)
 It's a Bet (1935)
 Show Flat (1936)
 Shipmates o' Mine (1936)
 Annie Laurie (1936)
 Television Talent (1937)
 Feather Your Nest (1937)
 Hold My Hand (1938)
 Thank Evans (1938)
 Sidewalks of London (1938)
 It's in the Air (1938)
 Bulldog Sees It Through (1940)
 Women Aren't Angels (1943)

References

External links

1912 births
1987 deaths
People from Mitcham
English stage actresses
English film actresses
20th-century English actresses
20th-century English singers
20th-century English women singers